Crime School is a 1938 Warner Bros. film directed by Lewis Seiler and starring the Dead End Kids and Humphrey Bogart.

Plot
A junkman does business with the Dead End Kids: Frankie, Squirt, Spike, Goofy, Fats, and Bugs. When the boys ask for a $20 payoff, "Junkie" says "Five is all you'll get. Now take it and get out of here." In a rage, Spike strikes the man in the back of the head with a hard object, and the junkman falls to the floor and doesn't move.  When Judge Clinton cannot convince the boys to divulge which one struck the damaging blow, they are all sent to reform school.

The harsh warden of the reformatory, Morgan, inflicts discipline at the school and flogs Frankie after he tries to escape. The superintendent of the state reformatories, Mark Braden, visits the school and finds evidence of Morgan's subtle cruelty, as in feeding his new inmates poor-quality food.  He then visits Frankie in the hospital ward, finding him untreated and the doctor inebriated. As a way of starting over, he fires the doctor, Morgan, and four ex-convict guards, while retaining the head guard, Cooper.   Braden takes charge of the reformatory himself and wins over the boys' cooperation by considerate treatment, while romancing Frankie's sister, Sue Warren.

Meanwhile, Cooper is afraid that Braden will learn of Morgan's embezzlement of the food budget, which would implicate him as well.  He learns that Spike is the one who dealt the blow to the junkman and blackmails him.  He gets him to tell Frankie that Braden's generous treatment is due to his sister's acceptance of Braden's attentions.  Although untrue, it causes the kids to escape from the school in Cooper's car with his gun. They go to Sue's apartment, and Frankie climbs the fire escape with the gun to confront Braden, but Sue and Braden dispel Frankie's suspicions.

Meanwhile, Cooper "discovers" that the kids have escaped, and Morgan calls the press to discredit Braden and get him fired.  But, Braden drives the boys back to the reformatory and gets them into their beds, before the Commissioner, alerted by Morgan, arrives for an inspection with the police in tow.  Their plot foiled and their fraud uncovered, Morgan and Cooper are arrested. The boys are subsequently paroled into the care of their parents.

Cast

The Dead End Kids
 Billy Halop as Frankie Warren
 Bobby Jordan as Lester "Squirt" Smith
 Huntz Hall as Richard "Goofy" Slade
 Leo Gorcey as Charles "Spike" Hawkins
 Bernard Punsly as George "Fats" Papadopolos
 Gabriel Dell as Timothy "Bugs" Burke

Additional cast

 Humphrey Bogart as Deputy Commissioner Mark Braden
 Gale Page as Sue Warren
 George Offerman, Jr. as Red
 Weldon Heyburn as Cooper
 Cy Kendall as Morgan
 Charles Trowbridge as Judge Clinton
 Spencer Charters as Old Doctor
 Donald Briggs as New Doctor
 Frank Jaquet as Commissioner 
 Helen MacKellar as Mrs. Burke
 Al Bridge as Mr. Burke
 Sibyl Harris as Mrs. Hawkins
 Paul Porcasi as Nick Papadopolos
 Frank Otto as Junkie
 Ed Gargan as Officer Hogan
 James B. Carson as Schwartz
 Hally Chester as Boy

Background
 As this was a Warner Bros. film and not a United Artists' film like Dead End, they advertised the kids as 'The Crime School Kids' in this film, and their next, Angels with Dirty Faces.  However, the name did not catch on and they remained 'The Dead End Kids'.
 Before the film was released, Halop, Dell, Hall, and Punsly were released from their contracts by Warner Brothers and they went on to make a film at Universal, Little Tough Guy.  The success of this film caused Warner to reconsider and they were rehired at a substantial raise.
The Dead End Kids received top billing over Humphrey Bogart for Crime School, with their typeface also larger than Bogart's in posters and advertising.

Home media
Warner Archives released the film on made to order DVD in the United States on August 4, 2009.

References

External links
 

1938 films
American black-and-white films
1930s English-language films
Films about juvenile delinquency
Films scored by Max Steiner
Films directed by Lewis Seiler
1938 crime films
American crime films
Warner Bros. films
1930s American films